Espen Dietrichson (born 17 September 1976 in Stavanger, Norway) is a Norwegian artist. He lives and works in Oslo, Norway.

Dietrichson was educated at Oslo National Academy of the Arts (2000–2004). He is working mainly within the field of sculpture.

Exhibitions
Espen Dietrichson has had several solo exhibitions:  Gallery Van Bau, Vestfossen (2006), Kunstnerforbundet, Oslo (2007), Bomuldsfabriken Kunsthall, Arendal, (2007), Unge Kunstneres Samfunn, Oslo (2008), Galleri Trafo, Asker (2009), Galerie Susan Nielsen, Paris (2010)

References
 Sketches for a Mechanical Sunrise, Editor: Eivind Slettemeås, texts by Eivind Slettemeås, Helga-Marie Nordby and Power Ekroth, Torpedo Press (2009)

External links

Espen Dietrichson først ut i monografiserie fra Torpedo Press at Kunstkritikk.no 
Espen Dietrichson at Bomuldsfabriken Kunsthall 

1976 births
Norwegian artists
Norwegian sculptors
Living people
Oslo National Academy of the Arts alumni